Viktor Gertler (24 August 1901 – 5 July 1969) was a Hungarian film editor and director active between the 1930s and 1960s.

Selected filmography
Editor
 The Three from the Filling Station (1930)
 The Man in Search of His Murderer (1931)
 Der Kongreß tanzt (1931)
 Inquest (1931)
 About an Inquest (1931)
 I by Day, You by Night (1932)
 Storms of Passion (1932)
 Congress Dances (1932) 
 Quick (1932)
 A City Upside Down (1933)
 Gently My Songs Entreat (1933)
 Peter (1934)
 Catherine the Last (1936)

Director
 Marika (1938)
 Állami Áruház (1953)
 The Magic Chair (1954)
 Gázolás (1956)
 Young Noszty and Mary Toth (1960)
 The Man of Gold (1962)

References

Bibliography
 Burns, Bryan. World Cinema: Hungary. Fairleigh Dickinson University Press, 1996.

External links

1901 births
1969 deaths
Hungarian film editors
Hungarian film directors
Film people from Budapest